The Talent Shop is a TV series on the DuMont Television Network which aired from October 13, 1951, to March 29, 1952. The hosts were Fred Robbins and Pat Adair. This was a talent show for young people, set in a New York City drugstore.

Episode status
As with most DuMont series, no episodes are known to exist.

See also
List of programs broadcast by the DuMont Television Network
List of surviving DuMont Television Network broadcasts

References

Bibliography
David Weinstein, The Forgotten Network: DuMont and the Birth of American Television (Philadelphia: Temple University Press, 2004) 
Alex McNeil, Total Television, Fourth edition (New York: Penguin Books, 1980) 
Tim Brooks and Earle Marsh, The Complete Directory to Prime Time Network TV Shows, Third edition (New York: Ballantine Books, 1964)

External links
The Talent Shop at IMDB
DuMont historical website

DuMont Television Network original programming
1951 American television series debuts
1952 American television series endings
1950s American game shows
Black-and-white American television shows
Lost American television shows
English-language television shows